Norman D. Smart (born September 29, 1947) is an American drummer.

He replaced Chip Damiani in the Remains in 1966, shortly before the band split up.

Smart was a member of the band Kangaroo, which released one album on MGM Records in 1968. Other members included John Hall (who went on to Orleans), Barbara Keith and Ted Speleos.

He then joined the band Mountain in 1969 and played on its first gigs, before being replaced by Corky Laing in late 1969. He played with Mountain at Woodstock in August 1969. The live recording of "Long Red" from the Woodstock set was released in 1972 on Mountain Live: The Road Goes Ever On. The drum break by Smart has been sampled many times by hip hop artists.

In 1969 he became a member of Ian and Sylvia's country rock group Great Speckled Bird. Their first album was produced by Todd Rundgren, with whom Smart would continue to work throughout the 1970s.

Smart, Jim Colegrove and Jeff Gutcheon formed the group Hungry Chuck in 1971. In 1973 Smart played and completed one tour with the Fallen Angels, Gram Parsons's group.

References

Biography of N.D. Smart

Living people
American rock drummers
Mountain (band) members
1947 births
Great Speckled Bird (band) members
20th-century American drummers
American male drummers
20th-century American male musicians
The Remains (band) members